Ponderosa High School is a public high school in Shingle Springs, California. Opened in 1963, it is a member of the El Dorado Union High School District in El Dorado County, California.

In the 2018–19 school year, there were 1,865 students enrolled. Ponderosa's mascot is the bruin bear.

Teachers 

Mr. Angelo
Mrs. Angelo
Mrs. Aguiar
Mr. Baginski
Ms. Beal
Mr. Beatty
Mr. Bennett
Ms. Bertram
Mr. Bowlson
Mrs. Brannon
Mrs. Brown
Mr. Burghardt
Ms. Couch
Ms. Edwards
Mr. Escobar
Mrs. Fletcher
Mrs. Fritz
Ms. Fugina
Mr. Fulp
Mrs. Gilroy
Ms. Graves
Mr. Gruwell
Mr. Harnden 
Mrs. Hodson
Mr. January
Mr. Jencks
Mr. Davy Johnson
Mrs. Eva Johnson
Mrs. Sarah Johnson
Mrs. Kessler
Mr. Khouri
Mr. LaBass
Mr. Lathrop
Mr. Lowden
Mrs. Luna
Mr. Mason
Mr. McClellan
Mrs. Millhollin
Mr. Moeller
Mrs. Mumford
Mrs. Norwood
Ms. Overman
Mrs. Pfeifer
Mr. Ralph
Mrs. Robinson
Ms. Schrock
Mrs. Selk
Mr. Shears
Ms. Shintaku
Mrs. Smith
Ms. Speake
Mrs. Spiess
Mrs. Spiess - Algebra 10-12
Ms. Stapp
Mr. Taylor
Mr. Thomas
Mr. Thompson
Mr. Tonelli
Ms. Walker
Ms. Wascher
Mr. John Wilkes
Mr. Williams
Mrs. Wilson
Mrs. Woodruff
Mr. Woolever
Ms. Yorba

Sports 
Ponderosa High School offers many sports programs, including cross country, basketball, baseball, football, golf, ski/snowboard, soccer, swimming, softball, tennis, track and field, volleyball, water polo and wrestling. The school is in the Division II Capital Valley Conference.

Notable alumni 
 Maria Alexander, author
 James Campen, former NFL offensive lineman; current offensive line coach of the Carolina Panthers
 Kurt Travis, lead singer for Sacramento-based post-hardcore band Dance Gavin Dance
 Valorie Kondos Field, former UCLA Bruins women's gymnastics head coach
 Joy Selig Petersen, gymnast
 Michael Stemmle, game designer
 Trevor Swartz, professional soccer player
 Joe Bitker, former MLB pitcher for the Oakland A's and Texas Rangers
 Tim Jones, former MLB pitcher for the Pittsburgh Pirates
 Christina Fusano, professional tennis player
 Colleen Shannon, disc Jockey and model
 Brad Waldow, professional basketball player

References

External links 
 

Public high schools in California
Educational institutions established in 1963
High schools in El Dorado County, California
1963 establishments in California